is a former Japanese football player.

Club career
Hironaga was born in Osaka Prefecture on 25 July 1975. After graduating from high school, he joined Verdy Kawasaki (later Tokyo Verdy) in 1994. He played as defensive midfielder and center back. In 1994, the club won the championships for the J1 League and J.League Cup. He then moved to his local club Gamba Osaka. He played many matches at Gamba, and returned to Verdy in June 1999. He played as a forward as well as a midfielder. His opportunity to play decreased in 2001 and he moved to the J2 League club Yokohama FC. He played many matches as defensive midfielder. He moved to Cerezo Osaka in 2003. He retired at the end of the 2004 season.

National team career
In July 1996, Hironaga was selected Japan U-23 national team for 1996 Summer Olympics. At this tournament, he played 2 matches as defensive midfielder. Although Japan won 2 matches, Japan lost at First round. At this time, Japan won Brazil in first game. It was known as "Miracle of Miami" (マイアミの奇跡) in Japan.

Club statistics

References

External links

1975 births
Living people
Association football people from Osaka Prefecture
Japanese footballers
J1 League players
J2 League players
Tokyo Verdy players
Gamba Osaka players
Yokohama FC players
Cerezo Osaka players
Footballers at the 1996 Summer Olympics
Olympic footballers of Japan
Association football midfielders